United States Sumo Federation is the organization that currently governs sumo for both men and women in the US. The main tournament they organise is the annual U.S. Sumo National Championships.

Notable current & past athletes

 Emmanuel Yarbrough (5-Time World Openweight Medalist)
 Trent Sabo (2-Time World lightweight Medalist)
 Roy Sims (2016 World Openweight Bronze)
 Wayne Vierra (1997 World Heavyweight Bronze)
 Nobuo Tsuchiya (1994 World Lightweight Bronze)
 Hideo Su'a (1992 World Middleweight Silver)

Notable Association & Clubs
 901 Sumo Club-  Memphis, TN  Facebook page
 Aloha Sumo Association-Honolulu, HI
 California Sumo Association-Los Angeles, CA  Website
 Dallas Sumo Club- Dallas, TX  Website
 Dark Circle Sumo Club-Austin, TX Facebook page
 Florida Sumo Association-Panama City, FL  Faceboook page
 Georgia Sumo Club-Atlanta, GA  Facebook page
 Honu Sumo Club- San Diego, CA  Facebook page
 Lone Star Sumo Association-San Antonio, TX  Facebook page
 Ohayō Sumo Association-  Cincinnati, OH Website
 Raijin Sumo Club-  Raleigh, NC  Facebook page
 Snake River Sumo Association-Rigby, ID
 South Mountain Martial Arts-Madison, NJ  Website
 Welcome Mat Sumo Club-Kansas City, MO  Facebook page
 Welcome Mat NOLA-LaPlace, LA  Website

US Sumo Open results and champions

US Sumo Open is the annual sumo competition run by USA Sumo (California Sumo Association) a USSF Affiliated Club. It has been held since 2001 in Los Angeles and has been called the largest amateur sumo event in the world.

References

External links
 Official Website

Sumo organizations
Sports governing bodies in the United States
Organizations based in Los Angeles